Lidia Ewa Burzyńska (born 27 August 1964 in Rzeki Wielkie) – is a Polish politician, teacher and local official.

Biography 
She graduated from the Silesian University (1990, History Department).

From 1994 to 1998 she was a councilor of the gmina Kłomnice. From 2006 to 2014 she was a councilor of the Częstochowa County, in 2014 she did not receive re-election.

In 2011 Burzyńska applied unsuccessfully for a parliamentary mandate. In the elections in 2015, she was again a candidate to the Sejm from the Częstochowa district. She was elected, receiving 9,760 votes. Lidia Burzyńska has obtained a parliamentary mandate again in the elections in 2019.

References 

1964 births
Living people
University of Silesia in Katowice alumni
Members of the Polish Sejm 2015–2019
Members of the Polish Sejm 2019–2023
People from Częstochowa County
Law and Justice politicians